Eyðgunn Jana Samuelsen (née Henriksen, 23 May 1959 in Sørvágur) is a Faroese teacher and politician (Social Democratic Party (Javnaðarflokkurin)).

Background 
Samuelsen graduated from her lower secondary school in Sørvágs skúli in 1976 and graduated from her high school (HF) Føroya Studentaskúli og HF-Skeið in 1978. Samuelsen took a degree in economics and history (cand.mag.) from Roskilde University in 1992.

She grew up in the small town, Sørvágur, with her father, mother and younger sister.

Political career 
She joined the Social Democratic Party in 1988. She was elected in the town council of Klaksvík for the first time in 1997. She has been a member of the Faroese parliament since 8 February 2008, the first years from 2008-2011 she was not directly elected but became a member when Helena Dam á Neystabø became minister. At the 2011 elections she was elected to the parliament and in 2015 she was reelected with 433 personal votes which was third most on her parties list.

References 

1959 births
Living people
Members of the Løgting
Social Democratic Party (Faroe Islands) politicians
Ministers of Social Affairs of the Faroe Islands
Women government ministers of the Faroe Islands
21st-century women politicians